Baak Maan Fu Yung (Cantonese Yale: baak3 maan6 fu3 yung1, Jyutping: baak3 maan6 fu3 jung1, literally The Millionaire, also had the English words of Who Wants to Be a Millionaire surrounding the Chinese title) is a Hong Kongese game show, based on the original British format of Who Wants to Be a Millionaire?. The show's first host was Kenneth Chan. The main goal of the game is to win HK$1 million (US$129,000) by correctly answering 15 multiple-choice questions. There are three lifelines: 50:50, Phone-a-Friend and Ask-the-Audience. Baak Maan Fu Yung first aired on April 29, 2001. It was broadcast by Hong Kong's ATV.

It is notable in ATV's 58-year history for being one of its few viewership successes over its rival station TVB.

As ATV returned broadcasting as an OTT provider in December 2017, a revival of the show was announced. The new series is hosted by Stephen Chan.

Money Tree

Notable Contestants

Top Prize Winners
 James Wong (黃霑) and Petrina Fung (馮寶寶), 15 July 2001 (celebrity edition)

 Stephen Chow (周星馳) and Erica Li (李敏), 21 August 2001 (celebrity edition)

 Chan Hon-cheung (陳漢翔), 2 November 2001

 Cheng Tak-cheung (鄭德璋), 7 February 2003 (million dollar tournament)
 Ray Fong (雷芳), (programme director of Asia Television Digital Media), 2018 (pilot)

Top Prize Losers (People who answered the final question incorrectly)
 Ling Wing Kuen(凌永權) and Ling Shuk Ling(凌淑玲), 9 November 2001 (lost HK$440,000)

 Peggy Cash and Rose Money, 1 June 2018

Notes

External links
 Official website (archived)
 Official website (2018 revival)
 2018 episodes including pilot

Who Wants to Be a Millionaire?
Asia Television original programming
Chinese game shows
2001 Hong Kong television series debuts
2005 Hong Kong television series endings